"I Wanna Be a Nudist" is a song by Australian rock band Regurgitator. The song was released in November 1999 as the second single from the band's third studio album ...art. The single peaked at number 75 in Australia.

Track listings

Music Video

The music video has the bandmembers working at a fast food restaurant called "Regurgiburger". 

The filming location of this music video was at a Bernie's fast food restaurant on Sandgate Road in the northern Brisbane suburb of Virginia, Queensland. As of 2022, the original fast food restaurant where the music video was filmed at has been torn down and a Guzman y Gomez Mexican fast food restaurant is built in its place.

Charts

Release history

References

 

1999 singles
1999 songs
Regurgitator songs
Song recordings produced by Magoo (Australian producer)
Warner Music Australasia singles